Senator Reardon may refer to:

Aaron Reardon (politician) (born 1970s), Washington State Senate
Keiron Reardon (1900–1978), Washington State Senate